The Limpopo women's cricket team, also known as the Limpopo Impalas, is the women's representative cricket team for the South African province of Limpopo. They compete in the Women's Provincial Programme and the CSA Women's Provincial T20 Competition.

History
Limpopo Women joined the South African domestic system in the 2004–05 season, competing in the Women's Provincial League. In their first season, they finished third in their group of four, winning one of their six matches. They have competed in the tournament ever since, but have never made it out of the initial group stage. The side has also competed in the CSA Women's Provincial T20 Competition since its inception in 2012–13, but have again never made it out of the initial group stages.

Players

Current squad
Based on appearances in the 2021–22 season. Players in bold have international caps.

Notable players
Players who have played for Limpopo and played internationally are listed below, in order of first international appearance (given in brackets):

  Alta Kotze (1997)
  Sunette Viljoen (2000)
  Hanri Strydom (2000)

See also
 Limpopo (cricket team)

References

Women's cricket teams in South Africa
Cricket in Limpopo